Raymond Marcellin (19 August 1914 in Sézanne, Marne – 8 September 2004) was a French politician.

Biography 
The son of a banker, he studied law at the University of Strasbourg and the University of Paris. He worked as a lawyer for three years, before being called into the army in September 1939. He was captured by the Wehrmacht, but managed to escape and return to France. Thanks to Maurice Bouvier-Ajam, he found a position in the Vichy regime.  His job was to diffuse the ideas of the Révolution nationale among youth and professional associations. 
He also taught at the University Jeune-France, a Vichy organization. For these services, he received the Order of the Francisque. Later, he joined the Résistance network Alliance of Marie-Madeleine Fourcade and Georges Loustaunau-Lacau. After the Libération, he was a gaullist candidate to the 1946 election in the Morbihan. 
However, he did not join De Gaulle's RPF, and caucused with the independents.
He initially supported the socialist governments of Léon Blum (December 1946) and Paul Ramadier (January 1947), but voted against them on the statute of Algeria in autumn 1947. In 1948, he was vice-president of the
Union démocratique des indépendants (democratic union of the independents). Starting 1949, He was both secretary general of Centre National des Indépendents caucus and adjoint general secretary of this party.
On 11 September 1948 he was appointed under-secretary of the Interior under the socialist minister of the Interior Jules Moch in the government formed by the radical Henri Queuille. On 29 October 1949, Raymond Marcellin was appointed Commerce and Industry under-secretary in the government of Georges Bidault. After the departure of the socialists from the government on 7 February 1950 he became Commerce and Industry secretary. He then proceeded to close the Chambre des Métiers de la Seine that had been controlled by communists since the Libération. He also fired seven contractants holding key positions in the Centre National du Cinéma as they were either communists or belonged to the CGT, a labor union with close ties to the Communist Party. 
In 1951, during his reelection campaign, he was allied with the Mouvement Républicain Populaire, but not with the gaullist Rassemblement du Peuple Français. On this occasion, he declared that voting for the gaullists was taking the risk of sending communists to the Assemblée Nationale. He was reelected on 17 June 1951. On 8 March 1952 Raymond Marcellin was made Minister of Information in the government of Antoine Pinay. He introduced a minimal service on state radio and TV in case of strike. After December 1952, and the fall of the government of Antoine Pinay, Raymond Marcellin no longer held cabinet positions. Raymond Marcellin was supportive of the continuation of the war in Indochina, 
and did not vote for the Pierre Mendès-France government. After being reelected in 1956, Raymond Marcellin
did not support the socialist government of Guy Mollet. However, he approved Mollet's policies in Algeria, and voted for giving special powers to the Army in the fight against Front de Libération Nationale on 12 March 1956. He regularly voted for the renewal of these special powers. He also supported the Suez intervention. However,
he voted against the fiscal package of the Mollet government that was supposed to finance the war in Algeria. 
This led to the fall of the Mollet government. Raymond Marcellin continued to support the engagement of French troops in Algeria, and voted against Pierre Pflimlin that he suspected of trying to change French policy in Algeria. On 1 June 1958 Raymond Marcellin voted for the government of Charles De Gaulle, the last government of the fourth republic.

During the fifth republic, he was a member of the National Center of Independents and Peasants (CNIP) and then of the Center of Social Democrats (CDS). On 15 May 1962 Raymond Marcellin entered the government as Minister of Health. In 1965, he was elected mayor of Vannes, a position he would retain until 1977. Raymond Marcellin was made  Minister of Industry from 8 January 1966 to 1 April 1967. Following the events of May 1968, he was appointed  Interior minister of France on 30 May 1968 replacing Christian Fouchet. De Gaulle said on this occasion that with Marcellin he now had the real Fouché. To Marcellin, the demonstrators were either traitors or dupes of an operation of the Cuban secret services. He increased the police budget, and pledged to have all the necessary police force in Paris to establish order. He dissolved in 1968 the right-wing organization Occident, along with various maoist groups. After De Gaulle resignation, in 1969, Raymond Marcellin
was maintained at the ministry of Interior by the new president Georges Pompidou. On 4 November 1970 Raymond Marcellin, relying on a law of 16 July 1949 on the protection of youth, signed a degree banning display, publicity and sale to minors of Hara-Kiri Hebdo, following the publication of an issue of this satirical magazine with a cover titled  Bal tragique à Colombey: 1 mort alluding disrespectfully to the death of Charles De Gaulle. In 1971, Raymond Marcellin  tried to introduce a modification of the law of 1901 on freedom of association, which would have made preliminary administrative authorization necessary before being able to create an association. This modification was rejected by the constitutional council, after intense lobbying by former president Vincent Auriol. In the same year, Raymond Marcellin introduced an anti-wreckers bill (Loi Anti-Casseurs), that made a crime of attendance at 
a meeting where violence occurs. In 1973, the Trotskyite Ligue Communiste and right-wing Ordre Nouveau were banned on the same day after a violent confrontation between the two groups. 
Raymond Marcellin was forced to resign on 27 February 1974, after policemen of the Directorate of Territorial Security were caught red-handed planting microphones in the offices of Le Canard Enchaîné, an investigating newspaper. He was replaced by Jacques Chirac as minister of the interior, and became minister of Agriculture.  He was then elected to the Senate on 22 September 1974. He remained a senator until 21 June 1981.

He then served as president of the Regional Council of Brittany from 1978 to 1986.

Writings 
 L'orientation professionnelle et le placement des jeunes (Paris: Recueil Sirey, 1941) (Thesis, University of Strasbourg)
 with Maurice Bouvier-Ajam Les Principaux Problèmes de l'orientation professionnelle (Clermont-Ferrand:  É. Chiron, 1942)
 L'Ordre public et les Groupes révolutionnaires (Paris : Plon, 1969)
 L'Importune Vérité. Dix ans après Mai 68, un ministre de l'Intérieur parle (Paris: Plon, 1978) (a book on the events of May 1968).
 La Guerre politique (Paris : Plon, 1985)
 L' Expérience du pouvoir (Paris : la Table ronde, 1990)

References 

1914 births
2004 deaths
French Ministers of Health
French interior ministers
French Ministers of Agriculture
Presidents of the Regional Council of Brittany
Members of the Regional Council of Brittany
National Centre of Independents and Peasants politicians
Independent Republicans politicians
Union for French Democracy politicians
Deputies of the 1st National Assembly of the French Fourth Republic
Deputies of the 2nd National Assembly of the French Fourth Republic
Deputies of the 3rd National Assembly of the French Fourth Republic
Deputies of the 1st National Assembly of the French Fifth Republic
Deputies of the 2nd National Assembly of the French Fifth Republic
Deputies of the 3rd National Assembly of the French Fifth Republic
Deputies of the 4th National Assembly of the French Fifth Republic
Deputies of the 5th National Assembly of the French Fifth Republic
French Senators of the Fifth Republic
Senators of Morbihan
Deputies of the 7th National Assembly of the French Fifth Republic
Deputies of the 8th National Assembly of the French Fifth Republic
Deputies of the 9th National Assembly of the French Fifth Republic
Deputies of the 10th National Assembly of the French Fifth Republic
Mayors of places in Brittany
French military personnel of World War II
Order of the Francisque recipients
People from Marne (department)
Politicians from Grand Est